The 1980–81 Town & Country League season was the 39th in the history of Eastern Counties Football League a football competition in England.

League table

The league featured 22 clubs which competed in the league last season, no new clubs joined the league this season.

League table

References

External links
 Eastern Counties Football League

1980-81
1980–81 in English football leagues